The 1999 elections to West Dunbartonshire Council were held on the 6 May 1999 and were the second to the unitary authority, which was created, along with 28 other local authorities, under the Local Government etc (Scotland) Act 1994.

Election results

Ward results

Subsequent changes
†Jim Bollan, elected as an independent councillor, became a member of the newly formed Scottish Socialist Party in 2000.

††In May 2001, after the wrongful dismissal of the council's Chief Executive, 4 Labour councillors, Councillors Campbell, McCafferty, Syme and Collins, rebelled against the party's administration to vote for a no confidence motion in the Council leader, Andrew White. The vote passed 12-10, but Councillor White refused to resign. The 4 councillors later left the Labour party to become independents and formed a new administration in August of that year with support from the SNP and SSP councillors. The new Council leader was Daniel McCafferty, one of the rebels.

References

External links

1999 Scottish local elections
1999
20th century in West Dunbartonshire